Simlabari, also known as Simlubari, is a census village in Baksa district, Assam, India. As per the 2011 Census of India, the Simlabari village has a total population of 4,357 people including 2,206 males and 2,151 females with a literacy rate of 54.56%.

References 

Villages in Baksa district